Albro Lake  is a lake of Halifax Regional Municipality, in Nova Scotia, Canada in the community of Dartmouth.

The lake lends its name to the surrounding Albro Lake neighbourhood of Dartmouth.

There are several public parks along the shores of the lake, including the Albro Lake Beach and Albro Lake Park.

See also
List of lakes in Nova Scotia

References
 National Resources Canada

Lakes of Nova Scotia
Dartmouth, Nova Scotia